X2000 is a 1998 short film directed by François Ozon.

Plot
A naked man (Bruno Slagmulder) wakes up in a luxury loft, which is a residential building in an unidentified European city, after a particularly wild New Year's Eve party of the year 2000. He finds a naked woman (Denise Aron-Schropfer) in his bed, and obviously he does not recognize or remember her. He walks naked through the apartment and discovers a pair of partygoers – two young boys, identical twins (Lionel Le Guevellou and Olivier Le Guevellou), in a sleeping bag, hugging each other. He looks out the window and recognizes a man (Flavien Coupeau) and woman (Lucia Sanchez) making love in the apartment across the street, while the woman who was sleeping beside him wakes up and takes a bath. While he looks at what is happening across the street, he falls off the table he was sitting on, and lands on the floor, breaking a glass. This noise wakes up the twins. He goes into the kitchen to throw the pieces of broken glass away, and discovers ants underneath the garbage can. He goes into the bathroom and tells the women in the bath about the plague of ants in the kitchen.

Cast
 Denise Aron-Schropfer as the woman
 Bruno Slagmulder as the man 
 Lucia Sanchez as a lover 
 Flavien Coupeau as a lover 
 Lionel Le Guevellou as a twin 
 Olivier Le Guevellou as a twin

Reception 
In the year 1999, the film won two awards at International Short Film Festival Oberhausen:
 Interfilm Award (awarded to François Ozon)
 Jury Prize for Best Short Film (awarded to François Ozon)

See also
 A Summer Dress

External links 
 
 

1998 films
Films directed by François Ozon
French short films
1990s French films